Genoplesium morinum, commonly known as the mulberry midge orchid, is a species of small terrestrial orchid that is endemic to New South Wales. It has a single thin leaf fused to the flowering stem and up to twenty crowded, dark reddish purple flowers. It has been known as "mulberries on sticks".

Description
The leaf sometimes remains attached to the tuber until the plant flowers in the next year. There is a thick, fleshy, dark purplish black callus in the centre of the labellum and extending almost to its tip. Flowering occurs from November to January.

Taxonomy and naming
Genoplesium morinum was first formally described in 1991 by David Jones from a specimen collected in the Kanangra-Boyd National Park and the description was published in The Orchadian. In 2002, David Jones and Mark Clements changed the name to Corunastylis morina but the change is not accepted by the Australian Plant Census. The specific epithet (morinum) is derived from the Latin word meaning "mulberry coloured", referring to the flower colour.

Prior to its formal description, William Nicholls noted the cattlemen knew this species as "mulberries on sticks".

Distribution and habitat

References

morinum
Endemic orchids of Australia
Orchids of New South Wales
Plants described in 1991